Loango is an unincorporated community in Covington County, Alabama, United States.

History
A post office operated under the name Loango between 1856 and 1907. The maternal great-great-grandparents of Bill Clinton are buried in the Old Loango Cemetery.

Name
The local explanation for the town name, is that it comes from a combination of the words load, and, and go. A more probable source is the Loango Coast and the port of Loango, Republic of Congo, a major source of slaves before the outlawing of the trans-Atlantic slave trade. (See: Louisiana State Penitentiary, also known as Angola.)

References

Unincorporated communities in Covington County, Alabama
Unincorporated communities in Alabama